The MV Kaye E. Barker is a self-discharging lake freighter owned and operated by the Interlake Steamship Company. She was originally built as the Edward B. Greene, and was later renamed Benson Ford before being sold to Interlake and named the Barker. It primarily hauls hematite pellets, stone, and coal across the North American Great Lakes.

Construction 

The Barker was constructed in Toledo in 1952 for the Cleveland Cliffs Steamship Company as the Edward B. Greene, one of the eight AAA-Korea class freighters used for ore and coal shipping. The Greene was the first lake freighter to be constructed entirely in drydock. She was christened on January 10, 1952, with her sea trials beginning on June 18 of the same year. On her maiden voyage, which took place on July 29, 19,788 tons of iron ore were loaded to be shipped to Toledo from Marquette, Michigan.

Description 
The Greene was built 647 feet long with a hull depth of 36 feet. It was powered by a 7,700 SHP DeLaval steam turbine and was equipped with 24 hatches. It measured 11,726 gross tons.

Service history 
The Greene hauled hematite pellets from ore docks in Marquette, Michigan, to steel refineries in Detroit.

Lengthening and conversion to a self-unloader 
In the winter of 1975–1976, Fraser Shipyards, Inc. was contracted by Cleveland Cliffs to lengthen the Greene with a 120-foot mid-body section, increasing capacity to almost 27,000 tons. At the same time, six of the other AAA-Korea class freighters were lengthened in the same way. In 1981, the ship was converted to a self-unloading vessel, with the addition of a 250-foot aft-mounted boom.

Purchase by Rouge Steel Company 
In 1985, four years after the conversion, the Greene was purchased by Rouge Steel Company, originally a division of Ford Motor Company. Upon the ship's purchase, it was renamed Benson Ford III. Its new route stretched from Marquette to Detroit to supply the Ford plant there.

Purchase by Interlake Shipping Company 
The Ford fleet was dissolved in 1989, leading to the Interlake Shipping Company's purchase of all remaining Ford boats. With the purchase, Interlake signed a contract to ship iron ore to the Rouge Steel plant. This created the Lakes Shipping Company, a new division of Interlake.

Service with Interlake

Second Renaming
With Interlake's purchase of the Benson Ford, the decision was made to rename it to the Kaye E. Barker, after the wife of Interlake's president.

Repowering
In 2012, the Barker was repowered at Bay Shipbuilding in Sturgeon Bay, Wisconsin. Her steam turbine was replaced with two 6-cylinder Rolls-Royce diesel engines and other equipment. Along with these upgrades, the Barker also received a replacement rudder and stock.

References 

Ships built in Toledo, Ohio
Great Lakes freighters
1952 ships